Sub-Saharan Africa is, geographically, the area and regions of the continent of Africa that lie south of the Sahara. These include Central Africa, East Africa, Southern Africa, and West Africa. Geopolitically, in addition to the African countries and territories that are situated fully in that specified region, the term may also include polities that only have part of their territory located in that region, per the definition of the United Nations (UN). This is considered a non-standardized geographical region with the number of countries included varying from 46 to 48 depending on the organization describing the region (e.g. UN, WHO, World Bank, etc.). The African Union (AU) uses a different regional breakdown, recognizing all 55 member states on the continent - grouping them into 5 distinct and standard regions.

The term serves as a grouping counterpart to North Africa, which is instead grouped with the definition of MENA (i.e. Middle East–North Africa) as it is part of the Arab world, and most North African states are likewise members of the Arab League. However, while they are also member states of the Arab League, the Comoros, Djibouti, Mauritania, and Somalia (and sometimes the Sudan) are all geographically considered to be part of sub-Saharan Africa. Overall, the UN Development Programme applies the "sub-Saharan" classification to 46 of Africa's 55 countries, excluding Djibouti, SADR, Somalia, and Sudan.

Since around 3900 BCE, the Saharan and sub-Saharan regions of Africa have been separated by the extremely harsh climate of the sparsely populated Sahara, forming an effective barrier that is interrupted only by the Nile in Sudan, though navigation on the Nile was blocked by the Sudd and the river's cataracts. There is also an evident genetic divide between North Africa and sub-Saharan Africa that dates back to the Neolithic. The Sahara pump theory explains how flora and fauna (including Homo sapiens) left Africa to penetrate Eurasia and beyond. African pluvial periods are associated with a "Wet Sahara" phase, during which larger lakes and more rivers existed.

Nomenclature

Geographers historically divided the region into several distinct ethnographic sections based on each area's respective inhabitants.

Commentators in Arabic in the medieval period used the general term bilâd as-sûdân ('Land of the Blacks') for the vast Sudan region (an expression denoting West and Central Africa), or sometimes extending from the coast of West Africa to Western Sudan. Its equivalent in Southeast Africa was Zanj ('Country of the Blacks'), which was situated in the vicinity of the Great Lakes region.

The geographers drew an explicit ethnographic distinction between the Sudan region and its analogue Zanj, from the area to their extreme east on the Red Sea coast in the Horn of Africa. In modern-day Ethiopia and Eritrea was Al-Habash or Abyssinia, which was inhabited by the Habash or Abyssinians, who were the forebears of the Habesha. In northern Somalia was Barbara or the Bilad al-Barbar ("Land of the Berbers"), which was inhabited by the Eastern Baribah or Barbaroi, as the ancestors of the Somalis were referred to by medieval Arab and ancient Greek geographers, respectively.

In the 19th and 20th centuries, the populations south of the Sahara were divided into three broad ancestral groups: Hamites and Semites in the Horn of Africa and Sahel related to those in North Africa, who spoke languages belonging to the Afroasiatic family; Negroes in most of the rest of the subcontinent (hence, the toponym Black Africa for Africa south of the Sahara), who spoke languages belonging to the Niger-Congo and Nilo-Saharan families; and Khoisan in Southern Africa, who spoke languages belonging to the Khoisan family.

Climate zones and ecoregions

Sub-Saharan Africa has a wide variety of climate zones or biomes. South Africa and the Democratic Republic of the Congo in particular are considered megadiverse countries. It has a dry winter season and a wet summer season.
 The Sahel extends across all of Africa at a latitude of about 10° to 15° N. Countries that include parts of the Sahara Desert proper in their northern territories and parts of the Sahel in their southern region include Mauritania, Mali, Niger, Chad and Sudan. The Sahel has a hot semi-arid climate.
 South of the Sahel, a belt of savanna (the West and East Sudanian savannas) stretch from the Atlantic Ocean to the Ethiopian Highlands. The more humid Guinean and Northern Congolian forest–savanna mosaic lie between the savannas and the equatorial forests.
 The Horn of Africa includes hot desert climate along the coast but a hot semi-arid climate can be found much more in the interior, contrasting with savanna and moist broadleaf forests in the Ethiopian Highlands.
 Tropical Africa encompasses tropical rainforest stretching along the southern coast of West Africa and across most of Central Africa (the Congo) west of the African Great Lakes.
 In East Africa, woodlands, savannas, and grasslands are found in the equatorial zone, including the Serengeti ecosystem in Tanzania and Kenya.
 Distinctive Afromontane forests, grasslands, and shrublands are found in the high mountains and mountain ranges of eastern Africa, from the Ethiopian Highlands to South Africa.
 South of the equatorial forests, the Western and Southern Congolian forest–savanna mosaic are transition zones between the tropical forests and the miombo woodland belt that spans the continent from Angola to Mozambique and Tanzania.
 The Namib and Kalahari Deserts lie in Southern Africa, and are surrounded by semi-deserts including the Karoo region of South Africa. The Bushveld grasslands lie to the east of the deserts.
 The Cape Floristic Region is at Africa's southern tip, and is home to diverse subtropical and temperate forests, woodlands, grasslands, and shrublands.

History

Prehistory

According to paleontology, early hominid skull anatomy was similar to that of their close cousins, the great African forest apes, gorilla and chimpanzee. However, they had adopted a bipedal locomotion and freed hands, giving them a crucial advantage enabling them to live in both forested areas and on the open savanna at a time when Africa was drying up, with savanna encroaching on forested areas. This occurred 10 million to 5 million years ago.

By 3 million years ago several australopithecine hominid species had developed throughout Southern, East, and Central Africa. They were tool users rather than tool manufacturers. The next major evolutionary step occurred around 2.3 million BCE, when primitive stone tools were used to scavenge the carcasses of animals killed by other predators, both for their meat and their marrow. In hunting, H. habilis was most likely not capable of competing with large predators and was more prey than hunter, although H. habilis likely did steal eggs from nests and may have been able to catch small game and weakened larger prey such as cubs and older animals. The tools were classed as Oldowan.

Roughly 1.8 million years ago, Homo ergaster first appeared in the fossil record in Africa. From Homo ergaster, Homo erectus (upright man) evolved 1.5 million years ago. Some of the earlier representatives of this species were small-brained and used primitive stone tools, much like H. habilis. The brain later grew in size, and H. erectus eventually developed a more complex stone tool technology called the Acheulean. Potentially the first hominid to engage in hunting, H. erectus mastered the art of making fire. They were the first hominids to leave Africa, going on to colonize the entire Old World, and perhaps later on giving rise to Homo floresiensis. Although some recent writers suggest that H. georgicus, a H. habilis descendant, was the first and most primitive hominid to ever live outside Africa, many scientists consider H. georgicus to be an early and primitive member of the H. erectus species.

The fossil and genetic evidence shows Homo sapiens developed in Southern and East Africa by around 350,000 to 260,000 years ago. and gradually migrated across the continent in waves. Between 50,000 and 60,000 years ago, their expansion out of Africa launched the colonization of the planet by modern humans. By 10,000 BCE, Homo sapiens had spread to all corners of the world. This dispersal of the human species is suggested by linguistic, cultural and genetic evidence.

During the 11th millennium BP, pottery was independently invented in West Africa, with the earliest pottery there dating to about 9,400 BC from central Mali. It spread throughout the Sahel and southern Sahara.

After the Sahara became a desert, it did not present a totally impenetrable barrier for travelers between north and south because of the application of animal husbandry towards carrying water, food, and supplies across the desert. Prior to the introduction of the camel, the use of oxen, mule, and horses for desert crossing was common, and trade routes followed chains of oases that were strung across the desert. The trans-saharan trade was in full motion by 500 BCE with Carthage being a major economic force for its establishment. It is thought that the camel was first brought to Egypt after the Persian Empire conquered Egypt in 525 BCE, although large herds did not become common enough in North Africa for camels to be the pack animal of choice for the trans-saharan trade.

West Africa

The Bantu expansion is a major migration movement that originated in West Central Africa (possibly around Cameroon) around 2500 BCE, reaching East and Central Africa by 1000 BCE and Southern Africa by the early centuries CE.

The Djenné-Djenno city-state flourished from 250 BCE to 900 CE and was influential to the development of the Ghana Empire. The Nok culture of Nigeria (lasting from 1,500 BCE to 200 CE) is known from a type of terracotta figure. There were a number of medieval empires of the southern Sahara and the Sahel, based on trans-Saharan trade, including the Ghana Empire and the Mali Empire, Songhai Empire, the Kanem Empire and the subsequent Bornu Empire. They built stone structures like in Tichit, but mainly constructed in adobe. The Great Mosque of Djenne is most reflective of Sahelian architecture and is the largest adobe building in the world.

In the forest zone, several states and empires such as Bono State, Akwamu and others emerged. The Ashanti Empire arose in the 18th century in modern-day Ghana. The Kingdom of Nri, was established by the Igbo in the 11th century. Nri was famous for having a priest-king who wielded no military power. Nri was a rare African state which was a haven for freed slaves and outcasts who sought refuge in their territory. Other major states included the kingdoms of Ifẹ and Oyo in the western block of Nigeria which became prominent about 700–900 and 1400 respectively, and center of Yoruba culture. The Yoruba's built massive mud walls around their cities, the most famous being Sungbo's Eredo. Another prominent kingdom in southwestern Nigeria was the Kingdom of Benin 9th–11th century whose power lasted between the 15th and 19th century and was one of the greatest Empires of African history documented all over the world. Their dominance reached as far as the well-known city of Eko which was named Lagos by the Portuguese traders and other early European settlers. The Edo-speaking people of Benin are known for their famous bronze casting and rich coral, wealth, ancient science and technology and the Walls of Benin, which is the largest man-made structure in the world.

In the 18th century, the Oyo and the Aro confederacy were responsible for most of the slaves exported from modern-day Nigeria, selling them to European slave traders. Following the Napoleonic Wars, the British expanded their influence into the Nigerian interior. In 1885, British claims to a West African sphere of influence received international recognition, and in the following year the Royal Niger Company was chartered under the leadership of Sir George Goldie. In 1900, the company's territory came under the control of the British government, which moved to consolidate its hold over the area of modern Nigeria. On 1 January 1901, Nigeria became a British protectorate as part of the British Empire, the foremost world power at the time. Nigeria was granted its independence in 1960 during the period of decolonization.

Central Africa

Archeological finds in Central Africa provide evidence of human settlement that may date back over 10,000 years. According to Zangato and Holl, there is evidence of iron-smelting in the Central African Republic and Cameroon that may date back to 3,000 to 2,500 BCE. Extensive walled sites and settlements have recently been found in Zilum, Chad.

Trade and improved agricultural techniques supported more sophisticated societies, leading to the early civilizations of Sao, Kanem, Bornu, Shilluk, Baguirmi, and Wadai.

Following the Bantu Migration into Central Africa, during the 14th century, the Luba Kingdom in southeast Congo came about under a king whose political authority derived from religious, spiritual legitimacy. The kingdom controlled agriculture and regional trade of salt and iron from the north and copper from the Zambian/Congo copper belt.

Rival kingship factions which split from the Luba Kingdom later moved among the Lunda people, marrying into its elite and laying the foundation of the Lunda Empire in the 16th century. The ruling dynasty centralised authority among the Lunda under the Mwata Yamyo or Mwaant Yaav. The Mwata Yamyo's legitimacy, like that of the Luba king, came from being viewed as a spiritual religious guardian. This imperial cult or system of divine kings was spread to most of central Africa by rivals in kingship migrating and forming new states. Many new states received legitimacy by claiming descent from the Lunda dynasties.

The Kingdom of Kongo existed from the Atlantic west to the Kwango river to the east. During the 15th century, the Bakongo farming community was united with its capital at M'banza-Kongo, under the king title, Manikongo. Other significant states and peoples included the Kuba Kingdom, producers of the famous raffia cloth, the Eastern Lunda, Bemba, Burundi, Rwanda, and the Kingdom of Ndongo.

East Africa

Sudan

Nubia, covered by present-day northern Sudan and southern Egypt, was referred to as "Aethiopia" ("land of the burnt face") by the Greeks. Nubia in her greatest phase is considered sub-Saharan Africa's oldest urban civilisation. Nubia was a major source of gold for the ancient world. Nubians built famous structures and numerous pyramids. Sudan, the site of ancient Nubia, has more pyramids than anywhere else in the world.

Horn of Africa

The Axumite Empire spanned the southern Sahara, south Arabia and the Sahel along the western shore of the Red Sea. Located in northern Ethiopia and Eritrea, Aksum was deeply involved in the trade network between India and the Mediterranean. Growing from the proto-Aksumite Iron Age period ( 4th century BCE), it rose to prominence by the 1st century CE. The Aksumites constructed monolithic stelae to cover the graves of their kings, such as King Ezana's Stele. The later Zagwe dynasty, established in the 12th century, built churches out of solid rock. These rock-hewn structures include the Church of St. George at Lalibela.

In ancient Somalia, city-states flourished such as Opone, Mosyllon and Malao that competed with the Sabaeans, Parthians and Axumites for the wealthy Indo–Greco–Roman trade.

In the Middle Ages several powerful Somali empires dominated the region's trade, including the Ajuran Sultanate, which excelled in hydraulic engineering and fortress building, the Sultanate of Adal, whose General Ahmed Gurey was the first African commander in history to use cannon warfare on the continent during Adal's conquest of the Ethiopian Empire, and the Geledi Sultanate, whose military dominance forced governors of the Omani empire north of the city of Lamu to pay tribute to the Somali Sultan Ahmed Yusuf.

Southeast Africa

According to the theory of recent African origin of modern humans, the mainstream position held within the scientific community, all humans originate from either Southeast Africa or the Horn of Africa. During the first millennium CE, Nilotic and Bantu-speaking peoples moved into the region, and the latter now account for three-quarters of Kenya's population.

On the coastal section of Southeast Africa, a mixed Bantu community developed through contact with Muslim Arab and Persian traders, leading to the development of the mixed Arab, Persian and African Swahili City States. The Swahili culture that emerged from these exchanges evinces many Arab and Islamic influences not seen in traditional Bantu culture, as do the many Afro-Arab members of the Bantu Swahili people. With its original speech community centered on the coastal parts of Tanzania (particularly Zanzibar) and Kenya a seaboard referred to as the Swahili Coast the Bantu Swahili language contains many Arabic loan-words as a consequence of these interactions.

The earliest Bantu inhabitants of the Southeast coast of Kenya and Tanzania encountered by these later Arab and Persian settlers have been variously identified with the trading settlements of Rhapta, Azania and Menouthias referenced in early Greek and Chinese writings from 50 CE to 500 CE. These early writings perhaps document the first wave of Bantu settlers to reach Southeast Africa during their migration.

Between the 14th and 15th centuries, large medieval Southeast African kingdoms and states emerged, such as the Buganda, Bunyoro and Karagwe kingdoms of Uganda and Tanzania.

During the early 1960s, the Southeast African nations achieved independence from colonial rule.

Southern Africa

Settlements of Bantu-speaking peoples, who were iron-using agriculturists and herdsmen, were already present south of the Limpopo River by the 4th or 5th century displacing and absorbing the original Khoisan speakers. They slowly moved south, and the earliest ironworks in modern-day KwaZulu-Natal Province are believed to date from around 1050. The southernmost group was the Xhosa people, whose language incorporates certain linguistic traits from the earlier Khoisan inhabitants. They reached the Fish River in today's Eastern Cape Province. Monomotapa was a medieval kingdom (c. 1250–1629), which existed between the Zambezi and Limpopo rivers of Southern Africa in the territory of modern-day Zimbabwe and Mozambique. Its old capital was located at Great Zimbabwe.

In 1487, Bartolomeu Dias became the first European to reach the southernmost tip of Africa. In 1652, a victualling station was established at the Cape of Good Hope by Jan van Riebeeck on behalf of the Dutch East India Company. For most of the 17th and 18th centuries, the slowly expanding settlement was a Dutch possession. In 1795, the Dutch colony was captured by the British during the French Revolutionary Wars. The British intended to use Cape Town as a major port on the route to Australia and India. It was later returned to the Dutch in 1803, but soon afterward the Dutch East India Company declared bankruptcy, and the Dutch (now under French control) and the British found themselves at war again. The British captured the Dutch possession yet again at the Battle of Blaauwberg, commanded by Sir David Blair. The Zulu Kingdom was a Southern African tribal state in what is now KwaZulu-Natal in southeastern South Africa. The small kingdom gained world fame during and after their defeat in the Anglo-Zulu War. During the 1950s and early 1960s, most sub-Saharan African nations achieved independence from colonial rule.

Demographics

Population

The current growth rate is 2.3%. The UN predicts for the region a population between 2 and 2.5 billion by 2050 with a population density of 80 per km2 compared to 170 for Western Europe, 140 for Asia and 30 for the Americas.

Sub-Saharan African countries top the list of countries and territories by fertility rate with 40 of the highest 50, all with TFR greater than 4 in 2008. All are above the world average except South Africa and Seychelles. More than 40% of the population in sub-Saharan countries is younger than 15 years old, as well as in Sudan, with the exception of South Africa.

GDP per Capita (PPP) (2016, 2017 (PPP, US$)), Life (Exp.) (Life Expectancy 2006), Literacy (Male/Female 2006), Trans (Transparency 2009), HDI (Human Development Index), EODBR (Ease of Doing Business Rank June 2008 through May 2009), SAB (Starting a Business June 2008 through May 2009), PFI (Press Freedom Index 2009)

Languages and ethnic groups

Sub-Saharan Africa contains over 1,500 languages.

Afroasiatic 
With the exception of the extinct Sumerian (a language isolate) of Mesopotamia, Afroasiatic has the oldest documented history of any language family in the world. Egyptian was recorded as early as 3200 BCE. The Semitic branch was recorded as early as 2900 BCE in the form of the Akkadian language of Mesopotamia (Assyria and Babylonia) and circa 2500 BCE in the form of the Eblaite language of north eastern Syria.

The distribution of the Afroasiatic languages within Africa is principally concentrated in North Africa and the Horn of Africa. Languages belonging to the family's Berber branch are mainly spoken in the north, with its speech area extending into the Sahel (northern Mauritania, northern Mali, northern Niger). The Cushitic branch of Afroasiatic is centered in the Horn, and is also spoken in the Nile Valley and parts of the African Great Lakes region. Additionally, the Semitic branch of the family, in the form of Arabic, is widely spoken in the parts of Africa that are within the Arab world. South Semitic languages are also spoken in parts of the Horn of Africa (Ethiopia, Eritrea). The Chadic branch is distributed in Central and West Africa. Hausa, its most widely spoken language, serves as a lingua franca in West Africa (Niger, Ghana, Togo, Benin, Cameroon, and Chad).

Khoisan 
The several families lumped under the term Khoi-San include languages indigenous to Southern Africa and Tanzania, though some, such as the Khoi languages, appear to have moved to their current locations not long before the Bantu expansion. In Southern Africa, their speakers are the Khoikhoi and San (Bushmen), in Southeast Africa, the Sandawe and Hadza.

Niger–Congo 
The Niger–Congo family is the largest in the world in terms of the number of languages (1,436) it contains. The vast majority of languages of this family are tonal such as Yoruba, and Igbo, However, others such as Fulani, Wolof and Kiswahili are not. A major branch of the Niger–Congo languages is Bantu, which covers a greater geographic area than the rest of the family. Bantu speakers represent the majority of inhabitants in southern, central and southeastern Africa, though San, Pygmy, and Nilotic groups, respectively, can also be found in those regions. Bantu-speakers can also be found in parts of Central Africa such as the Gabon, Equatorial Guinea and southern Cameroon. Swahili, a Bantu language with many Arabic, Persian and other Middle Eastern and South Asian loan words, developed as a lingua franca for trade between the different peoples in southeastern Africa. In the Kalahari Desert of Southern Africa, the distinct people known as Bushmen (also "San", closely related to, but distinct from "Hottentots") have long been present. The San evince unique physical traits, and are the indigenous people of southern Africa. Pygmies are the pre-Bantu indigenous peoples of Central Africa.

Nilo-Saharan 
The Nilo-Saharan languages are concentrated in the upper parts of the Chari and Nile rivers of Central Africa and Southeast Africa. They are principally spoken by Nilotic peoples and are also spoken in Sudan among the Fur, Masalit, Nubian and Zaghawa peoples and in West and Central Africa among the Songhai, Zarma and Kanuri. The Old Nubian language is also a member of this family.

Major languages of Africa by region, family and number of primary language speakers in millions:

Genetic history

Major cities

Sub-Saharan Africa has several large cities. Lagos is a city in the Nigerian state of Lagos. The city, with its adjoining conurbation, is the most populous in Nigeria, and the second-most populous in Africa after Cairo, Egypt. It is one of the fastest-growing cities in the world, and also one of the most populous urban agglomerations. Lagos is a major financial centre in Africa; this megacity has the highest GDP, and also houses Apapa, one of the largest and busiest ports on the continent.

Dar es Salaam is the former capital of, as well as the most populous city in, Tanzania; it is a regionally important economic centre. It is located on the Swahili coast.

Johannesburg is the largest city in South Africa. It is the provincial capital and largest city in Gauteng, which is the wealthiest province in South Africa. While Johannesburg is not one of South Africa's three capital cities, it is the seat of the Constitutional Court. The city is located in the mineral-rich Witwatersrand range of hills, and is the centre of a large-scale gold and diamond trade.

Nairobi is the capital and the largest city of Kenya. The name comes from the Maasai phrase Enkare Nyrobi, which translates to "cool water", a reference to the Nairobi River which flows through the city. The city is popularly referred to as the Green City in the Sun.

Other major cities in sub-Saharan Africa include Abidjan, Cape Town, Kinshasa, Luanda, Mogadishu and Addis Ababa.

Economy

In the mid-2010s, private capital flows to sub-Saharan Africa primarily from the BRICs, private-sector investment portfolios, and remittances began to exceed official development assistance.As of 2011, Africa is one of the fastest developing regions in the world. Six of the world's ten fastest-growing economies over the previous decade were situated below the Sahara, with the remaining four in East and Central Asia. Between 2011 and 2015, the economic growth rate of the average nation in Africa is expected to surpass that of the average nation in Asia. Sub-Saharan Africa is by then projected to contribute seven out of the ten fastest growing economies in the world. According to the World Bank, the economic growth rate in the region had risen to 4.7% in 2013, with a rate of 5.2% forecasted for 2014. This continued rise was attributed to increasing investment in infrastructure and resources as well as steady expenditure per household.

424 million people in sub-Saharan Africa were reportedly living in severe poverty in 2019. In 2022, 460 million people—an increase of 36 million in only three years—were anticipated to be living in extreme poverty as a result of the pandemic and the war. Sub-Saharan Africa's government debt rose from 28% of gross domestic product in 2012 to 50% of gross domestic product  in 2019. The COVID-19 pandemic caused it to rise to 57% of gross domestic product in 2021.

Sub-Saharan Africa was severely harmed when government revenue declined from 22% of GDP in 2011 to 17% in 2021. 15 African nations are at significant risk of debt, and 7 are currently in financial crisis according to the IMF. The region went on to receive IMF Special Drawing Rights of $23 billion in 2021 to assist critical public spending.

Energy and power

, 50% of Africa was rural with no access to electricity. In 2021, Africa generated 889 TWh of electricity, amounting to 3.13% of the global market share. Many countries are affected by power shortages.

The percentage of residences with access to electricity in sub-Saharan Africa is the lowest in the world. In some remote regions, fewer than one in every 20 households has electricity.

Because of rising prices in commodities such as coal and oil, thermal sources of energy are proving to be too expensive for power generation. Sub-Saharan Africa is expected to build additional hydropower generation capacity of at least 20,165 MW by 2014. The region has the potential to generate 1,750 TWh of energy, of which only 7% has been explored. The failure to exploit its full energy potential is largely due to significant underinvestment, as at least four times as much (approximately $23 billion a year) and what is currently spent is invested in operating high cost power systems and not on expanding the infrastructure.

African governments are taking advantage of the readily available water resources to broaden their energy mix. Hydro Turbine Markets in sub-Saharan Africa generated revenues of $120.0 million in 2007 and is estimated to reach $425.0 million. Asian countries, notably China, India, and Japan, are playing an active role in power projects across the African continent. The majority of these power projects are hydro-based because of China's vast experience in the construction of hydro-power projects and part of the Energy & Power Growth Partnership Services programme.

With electrification numbers, sub-Saharan Africa with access to the Sahara and being in the tropical zones has massive potential for solar photovoltaic electrical potential. Six hundred million people could be served with electricity based on its photovoltaic potential. China is promising to train 10,000 technicians from Africa and other developing countries in the use of solar energy technologies over the next five years. Training African technicians to use solar power is part of the China-Africa science and technology cooperation agreement signed by Chinese science minister Xu Guanhua and African counterparts during premier Wen Jiabao's visit to Ethiopia in December 2003.

The New Partnership for Africa's Development (NEPAD) is developing an integrated, continent-wide energy strategy. This has been funded by, amongst others, the African Development Bank (AfDB) and the EU-Africa Infrastructure Trust Fund. These projects must be sustainable, involve a cross-border dimension and/or have a regional impact, involve public and private capital, contribute to poverty alleviation and economic development, and involve at least one country in sub-Saharan Africa.

Renewable Energy Performance Platform was established by the European Investment Bank the United Nations Environment Programme with a five-year goal of improving energy access for at least two million people in sub-Saharan Africa. It has so far invested around $45 million to renewable energy projects in 13 countries in sub-Saharan Africa. Solar power and hydropower are among the energy methods used in the projects.

Media
Radio is the major source of information in sub-Saharan Africa. Average coverage stands at more than a third of the population. Countries such as Gabon, Seychelles, and South Africa boast almost 100% penetration. Only five countries Burundi, Djibouti, Eritrea, Ethiopia, and Somalia still have a penetration of less than 10%. Broadband penetration outside of South Africa has been limited where it is exorbitantly expensive. Access to the internet via cell phones is on the rise.

Television is the second major source of information. Because of power shortages, the spread of television viewing has been limited. Eight percent have television, a total of 62 million. But those in the television industry view the region as an untapped green market. Digital television and pay for service are on the rise.

Infrastructure

According to researchers at the Overseas Development Institute, the lack of infrastructure in many developing countries represents one of the most significant limitations to economic growth and achievement of the Millennium Development Goals (MDGs). Less than 40% of rural Africans live within two kilometers of an all-season road, the lowest level of rural accessibility in the developing world. Spending on roads averages just below 2% of GDP with varying degree among countries. This compares with 1% of GDP that is typical in industrialised countries, and 2–3% of GDP found in fast-growing emerging economies. Although the level of expenditure is high relative to the size of Africa's economies, it remains small in absolute terms, with low-income countries spending an average of about US$7 per capita per year. Infrastructure investments and maintenance can be very expensive, especially in such as areas as landlocked, rural and sparsely populated countries in Africa.

Infrastructure investments contributed to Africa's growth, and increased investment is necessary to maintain growth and tackle poverty. The returns to investment in infrastructure are very significant, with on average 30–40% returns for telecommunications (ICT) investments, over 40% for electricity generation and 80% for roads.

In Africa, it is argued that in order to meet the MDGs by 2015 infrastructure investments would need to reach about 15% of GDP (around $93 billion a year). Currently, the source of financing varies significantly across sectors. Some sectors are dominated by state spending, others by overseas development aid (ODA) and yet others by private investors. In sub-Saharan Africa, the state spends around $9.4 billion out of a total of $24.9 billion. In irrigation, SSA states represent almost all spending; in transport and energy a majority of investment is state spending; in ICT and water supply and sanitation, the private sector represents the majority of capital expenditure. Overall, aid, the private sector and non-OECD financiers between them exceed state spending. The private sector spending alone equals state capital expenditure, though the majority is focused on ICT infrastructure investments. External financing increased from $7 billion (2002) to $27 billion (2009). China, in particular, has emerged as an important investor.

Oil and minerals

The region is a major exporter to the world of gold, uranium, chromium, vanadium, antimony, coltan, bauxite, iron ore, copper, and manganese. South Africa is a major exporter of manganese as well as chromium. A 2001 estimate is that 42% of the world's reserves of chromium may be found in South Africa. South Africa is the largest producer of platinum, with 80% of the total world's annual mine production and 88% of the world's platinum reserve. Sub-Saharan Africa produces 33% of the world's bauxite, with Guinea as the major supplier. Zambia is a major producer of copper. The Democratic Republic of Congo is a major source of coltan. Production from DR Congo is very small, but the country has 80% of the proven reserves in Africa, which are 80% of those worldwide. Sub-Saharan Africa is a major producer of gold, producing up to 30% of global production. Major suppliers are South Africa, Ghana, Zimbabwe, Tanzania, Guinea, and Mali. South Africa had been first in the world in terms of gold production since 1905, but in 2007 it moved to second place, according to GFMS, the precious metals consultancy. Uranium is major commodity from the region. Significant suppliers are Niger, Namibia, and South Africa. Namibia was the number one supplier from sub-Saharan Africa in 2008. The region produces 49% of the world's diamonds.

By 2015, it is estimated that 25% of North American oil will be from sub-Saharan Africa, ahead of the Middle East. Sub-Saharan Africa has been the focus of an intense race for oil by the West, China, India, and other emerging economies, even though it holds only 10% of proven oil reserves, less than the Middle East. This race has been referred to as the second Scramble for Africa. All reasons for this global scramble come from the reserves' economic benefits. Transportation cost is low and no pipelines have to be laid as in Central Asia. Almost all reserves are offshore, so political turmoil within the host country will not directly interfere with operations. Sub-Saharan oil is viscous, with a very low sulfur content. This quickens the refining process and effectively reduces costs. New sources of oil are being located in sub-Saharan Africa more frequently than anywhere else. Of all new sources of oil,  are in sub-Saharan Africa.

Agriculture

Sub-Saharan Africa has more variety of grains than anywhere in the world. Between 13,000 and 11,000 BCE wild grains began to be collected as a source of food in the cataract region of the Nile, south of Egypt. The collecting of wild grains as source of food spread to Syria, parts of Turkey, and Iran by the eleventh millennium BCE. By the tenth and ninth millennia southwest Asians domesticated their wild grains, wheat, and barley after the notion of collecting wild grains spread from the Nile.

Numerous crops have been domesticated in the region and spread to other parts of the world. These crops included sorghum, castor beans, coffee, cotton okra, black-eyed peas, watermelon, gourd, and pearl millet. Other domesticated crops included teff, enset, African rice, yams, kola nuts, oil palm, and raffia palm.

Domesticated animals include the guinea fowl and the donkey.

Agriculture represents 20% to 30% of GDP and 50% of exports. In some cases, 60% to 90% of the labor force are employed in agriculture. Most agricultural activity is subsistence farming. This has made agricultural activity vulnerable to climate change and global warming. Biotechnology has been advocated to create high yield, pest and environmentally resistant crops in the hands of small farmers. The Bill and Melinda Gates foundation is a strong advocate and donor to this cause. Biotechnology and GM crops have met resistance both by natives and environmental groups.

Cash crops include cotton, coffee, tea, cocoa, sugar, and tobacco.

The OECD says Africa has the potential to become an agricultural superbloc if it can unlock the wealth of the savannahs by allowing farmers to use their land as collateral for credit. There is such international interest in sub-Saharan agriculture, that the World Bank increased its financing of African agricultural programs to $1.3 billion in the 2011 fiscal year. Recently, there has been a trend to purchase large tracts of land in sub-Sahara for agricultural use by developing countries.
Early in 2009, George Soros highlighted a new farmland buying frenzy caused by growing population, scarce water supplies and climate change. Chinese interests bought up large swathes of Senegal to supply it with sesame. Aggressive moves by China, South Korea, and Gulf states to buy vast tracts of agricultural land in sub-Saharan Africa could soon be limited by a new global international protocol.

Education

Forty percent of African scientists live in OECD countries, predominantly in Europe, the United States and Canada. This has been described as an African brain drain. According to Naledi Pandor, the South African Minister of Science and Technology, even with the drain enrollments in sub-Saharan African universities tripled between 1991 and 2005, expanding at an annual rate of 8.7%, which is one of the highest regional growth rates in the world. In the last 10 to 15 years interest in pursuing university-level degrees abroad has increased.

According to the CIA, low global literacy rates are concentrated in sub-Saharan Africa, West Asia and South Asia. However, literacy rates in sub-Saharan Africa vary significantly between countries. The highest registered literacy rate in the region is in Zimbabwe (90.7%; 2003 est.), while the lowest literacy rate is in South Sudan (27%).

Research on human capital formation was able to determine, that the numeracy levels of sub-Saharan Africa and Africa, in general, were higher than numeracy levels in South Asia. In the 1940s more than 75% of the population of sub-Saharan Africa was numerate. The numeracy of the West African countries, Benin and Ghana, was even higher with more than 80% of the population being numerate. In contrast, numeracy in South Asia was only around 50%.

Sub-Saharan African countries that have higher diversity has been found to lead to a poorer economy. Researchers have argued that this is because of ethnic favoritism in their politics. Sub-Saharan leaders are more likely to provide better resources to their coethnic groups when in power. A study found that children are more likely to attend school by 2.25% increase on average. While they complete school on 1.80% increase on average. Similarly a 1% increase in GDP  is associated with a 1.5-percentage-point increase in the effect primary school attendance.

Sub-Saharan African countries spent an average of 0.3% of their GDP on science and technology on in 2007. This represents an increase from US$1.8 billion in 2002 to US$2.8 billion in 2007, a 50% increase in spending.

Major progress in access to education 

At the World Conference held in Jomtien, Thailand in 1990, delegates from 155 countries and representatives of some 150 organizations gathered with the goal to promote universal primary education and the radical reduction of illiteracy before the end of the decade. The World Education Forum, held ten years later in Dakar, Senegal, provided the opportunity to reiterate and reinforce these goals. This initiative contributed to having education made a priority of the Millennium Development Goals in 2000, with the aim of achieving universal schooling (MDG2) and eliminating gender disparities, especially in primary and secondary education (MDG3). Since the World Education Forum in Dakar, considerable efforts have been made to respond to these demographic challenges in terms of education. The amount of funds raised has been decisive. Between 1999 and 2010, public spending on education as a percentage of gross national product (GNP) increased by 5% per year in sub-Saharan Africa, with major variations between countries, with percentages varying from 1.8% in Cameroon to over 6% in Burundi. As of 2015, governments in sub-Saharan Africa spend on average 18% of their total budget on education, against 15% in the rest of the world.

In the years immediately after the Dakar Forum, the efforts made by the African States towards achieving EFA produced multiple results in sub-Saharan Africa. The greatest advance was in access to primary education, which governments had made their absolute priority. The number of children in a primary school in sub-Saharan Africa thus rose from 82 million in 1999 to 136.4 million in 2011. In Niger, for example, the number of children entering school increased by more than three-and-a-half times between 1999 and 2011. In Ethiopia, over the same period, over 8.5 million more children were admitted to primary school. The net rate of first-year access in sub-Saharan Africa has thus risen by 19 points in 12 years, from 58% in 1999 to 77% in 2011. Despite the considerable efforts, the latest available data from the UNESCO Institute for Statistics estimates that, for 2012, there were still 57.8 million children who were not in school. Of these, 29.6 million were in sub-Saharan Africa alone, a figure which has not changed for several years. Many sub-Saharan countries have notably included the first year of secondary school in basic education. In Rwanda, the first year of secondary school was attached to primary education in 2009, which significantly increased the number of pupils enrolled at this level of education. In 2012, the primary completion rate (PCR) – which measures the proportion of children reaching the final year of primary school – was 70%, meaning that more than three out of ten children entering primary school do not reach the final primary year.

Literacy rates have gone up in sub-Saharan Africa, and internet access has improved considerably. At least 39 countries in sub-Saharan Africa have some large-scale school feeding programs, which can improve access to education. In aggregate, 16% of school-age children (and 25% of primary school-age children) in the region benefit from school meal programs, and about 82% of the funding for these programs is provided by governments. Nonetheless, a lot must yet happen for this region to catch up. The statistics show that the literacy rate for sub-Saharan Africa was 65% in 2017. In other words, one-third of the people aged 15 and above were unable to read and write. The comparative figure for 1984 was an illiteracy rate of 49%. In 2017, only about 22% of Africans were internet users at all, according to the International Telecommunication Union (ITU).

Science and technology

Health

In 1987, the Bamako Initiative conference organized by the World Health Organization was held in Bamako, the capital of Mali, and helped reshape the health policy of sub-Saharan Africa. The new strategy dramatically increased accessibility through community-based healthcare reform, resulting in more efficient and equitable provision of services. A comprehensive approach strategy was extended to all areas of health care, with subsequent improvement in the health care indicators and improvement in health care efficiency and cost.

In 2011, sub-Saharan Africa was home to 69% of all people living with HIV/AIDS worldwide. In response, a number of initiatives have been launched to educate the public on HIV/AIDS. Among these are combination prevention programmes, considered to be the most effective initiative, the abstinence, be faithful, use a condom campaign, and the Desmond Tutu HIV Foundation's outreach programs. According to a 2013 special report issued by the Joint United Nations Programme on HIV/AIDS (UNAIDS), the number of HIV positive people in Africa receiving anti-retro viral treatment in 2012 was over seven times the number receiving treatment in 2005, with an almost 1 million added in the last year alone. The number of AIDS-related deaths in sub-Saharan Africa in 2011 was 33 percent less than the number in 2005. The number of new HIV infections in sub-Saharan Africa in 2011 was 25 percent less than the number in 2001.

Life expectancy at birth in sub-Saharan Africa increased from 40 years in 1960 to 61 years in 2017.

Malaria is an endemic illness in sub-Saharan Africa, where the majority of malaria cases and deaths worldwide occur. Routine immunization has been introduced in order to prevent measles. Onchocerciasis ("river blindness"), a common cause of blindness, is also endemic to parts of the region. More than 99% of people affected by the illness worldwide live in 31 countries therein. In response, the African Programme for Onchocerciasis Control (APOC) was launched in 1995 with the aim of controlling the disease. Maternal mortality is another challenge, with more than half of maternal deaths in the world occurring in sub-Saharan Africa. However, there has generally been progress here as well, as a number of countries in the region have halved their levels of maternal mortality since 1990. Additionally, the African Union in July 2003 ratified the Maputo Protocol, which pledges to prohibit female genital mutilation (FGM).

National health systems vary between countries. In Ghana, most health care is provided by the government and largely administered by the Ministry of Health and Ghana Health Services. The healthcare system has five levels of providers: health posts which are first-level primary care for rural areas, health centers and clinics, district hospitals, regional hospitals, and tertiary hospitals. These programs are funded by the government of Ghana, financial credits, Internally Generated Fund (IGF), and Donors-pooled Health Fund.

Religion

African countries below the Sahara are largely Christian, while those above the Sahara, in North Africa, are predominantly Islamic. There are also Muslim majorities in parts of the Horn of Africa (Djibouti and Somalia) and in the Sahel and Sudan regions (the Gambia, Sierra Leone, Guinea, Mali, Niger and Senegal), as well as significant Muslim communities in Ethiopia and Eritrea, and on the Swahili Coast (Tanzania and Kenya). Mauritius is the only country in Africa to have a Hindu majority. In 2012, sub-Saharan Africa constituted in absolute terms the third world's largest Christian population, after Europe and Latin America respectively. In 2012, sub-Saharan Africa also constitute in absolute terms the third world's largest Muslim population, after Asia and the Middle East and North Africa respectively.

Traditional African religions can be broken down into linguistic cultural groups, with common themes. Among Niger–Congo-speakers is a belief in a creator god or higher deity, along with ancestor spirits, territorial spirits, evil caused by human ill will and neglecting ancestor spirits, and priests of territorial spirits. New world religions such as Santería, Vodun, and Candomblé, would be derived from this world. Among Nilo-Saharan speakers is the belief in Divinity; evil is caused by divine judgement and retribution; prophets as middlemen between Divinity and man. Among Afro-Asiatic-speakers is henotheism, the belief in one's own gods but accepting the existence of other gods; evil here is caused by malevolent spirits. The Semitic Abrahamic religion of Judaism is comparable to the latter world view. San religion is non-theistic but a belief in a Spirit or Power of existence which can be tapped in a trance-dance; trance-healers.

Generally, traditional African religions are united by an ancient complex animism and ancestor worship.

Traditional religions in sub-Saharan Africa often display complex ontology, cosmology and metaphysics. Mythologies, for example, demonstrated the difficulty fathers of creation had in bringing about order from chaos. Order is what is right and natural and any deviation is chaos. Cosmology and ontology is also neither simple or linear. It defines duality, the material and immaterial, male and female, heaven and earth. Common principles of being and becoming are widespread: Among the Dogon, the principle of Amma (being) and Nummo (becoming), and among the Bambara, Pemba (being) and Faro (becoming).

West Africa
 Akan mythology
 Ashanti mythology (Ghana)
 Dahomey (Fon) mythology
 Efik mythology (Nigeria, Cameroon)
 Igbo mythology (Nigeria)
 Serer religion and Serer creation myth (Senegal, Gambia and Mauritania)
 Yoruba mythology (Nigeria, Benin)

Central Africa
 Dinka mythology (South Sudan)
 Lotuko mythology (South Sudan)
 Bushongo mythology (Congo)
 Bambuti (Pygmy) mythology (Congo)
 Lugbara mythology (Congo)

Southeast Africa
 Akamba mythology (eastern Kenya)
 Masai mythology (Kenya, Tanzania)

Southern Africa
 Khoisan religion
 Lozi mythology (Zambia)
 Tumbuka mythology (Malawi)
 Zulu mythology (South Africa)

Sub-Saharan traditional divination systems display great sophistication. For example, the bamana sand divination uses well established symbolic codes that can be reproduced using four bits or marks. A binary system of one or two marks are combined. Random outcomes are generated using a fractal recursive process. It is analogous to a digital circuit but can be reproduced on any surface with one or two marks. This system is widespread in sub-Saharan Africa.

Culture

Sub-Saharan Africa is diverse, with many communities, villages, and cities, each with their own beliefs and traditions. Traditional African Societies are communal, they believe that the needs of the many far outweigh an individual needs and achievements. Basically, an individual's keep must be shared with other extended family members. Extended families are made up of various individuals and families who have shared responsibilities within the community. This extended family is one of the core aspects of every African community. "An African will refer to an older person as auntie or uncle. Siblings of parents will be called father or mother rather than uncle and aunt. Cousins will be called brother or sister". This system can be very difficult for outsiders to understand; however, it is no less important. "Also reflecting their communal ethic, Africans are reluctant to stand out in a crowd or to appear different from their neighbors or colleagues, a result of social pressure to avoid offense to group standards and traditions." Women also have a very important role in African culture because they take care of the house and children. Traditionally, in many cultures "men do the heavy work of clearing and plowing the land, women sow the seeds, tend the fields, harvest the crops, haul the water, and bear the major burden for growing the family's food". Despite their work in the fields, women are expected to be subservient to men in some African cultures. "When young women migrate to cities, this imbalance between the sexes, as well as financial need, often causes young women of lower economic status, who lack education and job training, to have sexual relationships with older men who are established in their work or profession and can afford to support a girlfriend or two".

Art

The oldest abstract art in the world is a shell necklace, dated to 82,000 years, in the Cave of Pigeons in Taforalt, eastern Morocco. The second-oldest abstract form of art, and the oldest rock art, is found in the Blombos Cave at the Cape in South Africa, dated 77,000 years. Sub-Saharan Africa has some of the oldest and most varied style of rock art in the world.

Although sub-Saharan African art is very diverse, there are some common themes. One is the use of the human figure. Second, there is a preference for sculpture. Sub-Saharan African art is meant to be experienced in three dimensions, not two. A house is meant to be experienced from all angles. Third, art is meant to be performed. Sub-Saharan Africans have a specific name for masks. The name incorporates the sculpture, the dance, and the spirit that incorporates the mask. The name denotes all three elements. Fourth, art that serves a practical function. The artist and craftsman are not separate. A sculpture shaped like a hand can be used as a stool. Fifth, the use of fractals or non-linear scaling. The shape of the whole is the shape of the parts at different scales. Before the discovery of fractal geometry], Leopold Sedar Senghor, Senegal's first president, referred to this as "dynamic symmetry". William Fagg, a British art historian, has compared it to the logarithmic mapping of natural growth by biologist D'Arcy Thompson. Lastly, sub-Saharan African art is visually abstract, instead of naturalistic. Sub-Saharan African art represents spiritual notions, social norms, ideas, values, etc. An artist might exaggerate the head of a sculpture in relation to the body not because he does not know anatomy but because he wants to illustrate that the head is the seat of knowledge and wisdom. 

The visual abstraction of African art was very influential in the works of modernist artist like Pablo Picasso, Henri Matisse, and Jacques Lipchitz.

Architecture

Music

Traditional sub-Saharan African music is as diverse as the region's various populations. The common perception of sub-Saharan African music is that it is rhythmic music centered around the drums. This is partially true. A large part of sub-Saharan music, mainly among speakers of Niger–Congo and Nilo-Saharan languages, is rhythmic and centered around the drum. Sub-Saharan music is polyrhythmic, usually consisting of multiple rhythms in one composition. Dance involves moving multiple body parts. These aspects of sub-Saharan music has been transferred to the new world by enslaved sub-Saharan Africans and can be seen in its influence on music forms as samba, jazz, rhythm and blues, rock and roll, salsa, reggae and rap music.

But sub-Saharan music involves a lot of music with strings, horns, and very little poly-rhythms. Music from the eastern sahel and along the nile, among the Nilo-Saharan, made extensive use of strings and horns in ancient times. Among the Afro-Asiatics of Northeast Africa, we see extensive use of string instruments and the pentatonic scale. Dancing involve swaying body movements and footwork. Among the San is extensive use of string instruments with emphasis on footwork.

Modern sub-Saharan African music has been influence by music from the New World (Jazz, Salsa, Rhythm and Blues etc.) vice versa being influenced by enslaved sub-Saharan Africans. Popular styles are Mbalax in Senegal and Gambia, Highlife in Ghana, Zoblazo in Ivory Coast, Makossa in Cameroon, Soukous in the Democratic Republic of Congo, Kizomba in Angola, and Mbaqanga in South Africa. New World styles like Salsa, R&B/Rap, Reggae, and Zouk also have widespread popularity.

Cuisine

Sub-Saharan African cuisine is very diverse. A lot of regional overlapping occurs, but there are dominant elements region by region.

West African cuisine can be described as starchy, flavorfully spicey. Dishes include fufu, kenkey, couscous, garri, foutou, and banku. Ingredients are of native starchy tubers, yams, cocoyams, and cassava. Grains include millet, sorghum, and rice, usually in the Sahel, are incorporated. Oils include palm oil and shea butter (Sahel). One finds recipes that mix fish and meat. Beverages are palm wine(sweet or sour) and millet beer. Roasting, baking, boiling, frying, mashing, and spicing are all cooking techniques.

Southeast African cuisine especially those of the Swahilis reflects its Islamic, geographical Indian Ocean cultural links. Dishes include ugali, sukuma wiki, and halva. Spices such as curry, saffron, cloves, cinnamon, pomegranate juice, cardamon, ghee, and sage are used, especially among Muslims. Meat includes cattle, sheep, and goats, but is rarely eaten since its viewed as currency and wealth.

In the Horn of Africa, pork and non-fish seafood are avoided by Christians and Muslims. Dairy products and all meats are avoided during lent by Ethiopians. Maize (corn) is a major staple. Cornmeal is used to make ugali, a popular dish with different names. Teff is used to make injera or canjeero (Somali) bread. Other important foods include enset, noog, lentils, rice, banana, leafy greens, chiles, peppers, coconut milk, and tomatoes. Beverages are coffee (domesticated in Ethiopia), chai tea, fermented beer from banana or millet. Cooking techniques include roasting and marinating.

Central African cuisine connects with all major regions of sub-Saharan Africa: Its cuisine reflects that. Ugali and fufu are eaten in the region. Central African cuisine is very starchy and spicy hot. Dominant crops include plantains, cassava, peanuts, chillis, and okra. Meats include beef, chicken, and sometimes exotic meats called bush meat (antelope, warthog, crocodile). Widespread spicy hot fish cuisine is one of the differentiating aspects. Mushroom is sometimes used as a meat substitute.

Traditional Southern African cuisine surrounds meat. Traditional society typically focused on raising, sheep, goats, and especially cattle. Dishes include braai (barbecue meat), sadza, bogobe, pap (fermented cornmeal), milk products (buttermilk, yoghurt). Crops utilised are sorghum, maize (corn), pumpkin beans, leafy greens, and cabbage. Beverages include ting (fermented sorghum or maize), milk, chibuku (milky beer). Influences from the Indian and Malay communities can be seen in its use of curries, sambals, pickled fish, fish stews, chutney, and samosa. European influences can be seen in cuisines like biltong (dried beef strips), potjies (stews of maize, onions, tomatoes), French wines, and crueler or koeksister (sugar syrup cookie).

Clothing

Like most of the world, sub-Saharan Africans have adopted Western-style clothing. In some country like Zambia, used Western clothing has flooded markets, causing great angst in the retail community. Sub-Saharan Africa boasts its own traditional clothing style. Cotton seems to be the dominant material.

In East Africa, one finds extensive use of cotton clothing. Shemma, shama, and kuta are types of Ethiopian clothing. Kanga are Swahili cloth that comes in rectangular shapes, made of pure cotton, and put together to make clothing. Kitenges are similar to kangas and kikoy, but are of a thicker cloth, and have an edging only on a long side. Kenya, Uganda, Tanzania, and South Sudan are some of the African countries where kitenge is worn. In Malawi, Namibia and Zambia, kitenge is known as Chitenge. One of the unique materials, which is not a fiber and is used to make clothing is barkcloth, an innovation of the Baganda people of Uganda. It came from the Mutuba tree (Ficus natalensis). On Madagascar a type of draped cloth called lamba is worn.

In West Africa, again cotton is the material of choice. In the Sahel and other parts of West Africa the boubou and kaftan style of clothing are featured. Kente cloth is created by the Akan people of Ghana and Ivory Coast, from silk of the various moth species in West Africa. Kente comes from the Akan twi word kenten which means basket. It is sometimes used to make dashiki and kufi. Adire is a type of Yoruba cloth that is starch resistant. Raffia cloth and barkcloth are also utilised in the region.

In Central Africa, the Kuba people developed raffia cloth from the raffia plant fibers. It was widely used in the region. Barkcloth was also extensively used.

In Southern Africa one finds numerous uses of animal hide and skins for clothing. The Ndau in central Mozambique and the Shona mix hide with barkcloth and cotton cloth. Cotton cloth is referred to as machira. Xhosa, Tswana, Sotho, and Swazi also made extensive use of hides. Hides come from cattle, sheep, goat, and elephant. Leopard skins were coveted and were a symbol of kingship in Zulu society. Skins were tanned to form leather, dyed, and embedded with beads.

Theater

Film industry

Games

Sports

Football (soccer) is the most popular sport in sub-Saharan Africa. Sub-Saharan men are its main patrons. Major competitions include the African Champions League, a competition for the best clubs on the continent and the Confederation Cup, a competition primarily for the national cup winner of each African country. The Africa Cup of Nations is a competition of 16 national teams from various African countries held every two years. South Africa hosted the 2010 FIFA World Cup, a first for a sub-Saharan country. In 2010, Cameroon played in the World Cup for the sixth time, which is the current record for a sub-Saharan team. In 1996 Nigeria won the Olympic gold for football. In 2000 Cameroon maintained the continent's supremacy by winning the title too. Momentous achievements for sub-Saharan African football. Famous sub-Saharan football stars include Abedi Pele, Emmanuel Adebayor, George Weah, Michael Essien, Didier Drogba, Roger Milla, Nwankwo Kanu, Jay-Jay Okocha, Bruce Grobbelaar, Samuel Eto'o, Kolo Touré, Yaya Touré, Sadio Mané and Pierre-Emerick Aubameyang. The most talented sub-Saharan African football players find themselves courted and sought after by European leagues. There are currently more than 1000 Africans playing for European clubs. Sub-Saharan Africans have found themselves the target of racism by European fans. FIFA has been trying hard to crack down on racist outburst during games.

Rugby is also popular in sub-Saharan Africa. The Confederation of African Rugby governs rugby games in the region. South Africa is a major force in the game and won the Rugby World Cup in 1995, 2007 and 2019. Africa is also allotted one guaranteed qualifying place in the Rugby World Cup.

Boxing is also a popular sport. Battling Siki the first world champion to come out of sub-Saharan Africa. Countries such as Nigeria, Ghana and South Africa have produced numerous professional world champions such as Dick Tiger, Hogan Bassey, Gerrie Coetzee, Samuel Peter, Azumah Nelson and Jake Matlala.

Cricket has a following. The African Cricket Association is an international body which oversees cricket in African countries. South Africa and Zimbabwe have their own governing bodies. In 2003 the Cricket World Cup was held in South Africa, first time it was held in sub-Saharan Africa.

Over the years, Ethiopia and Kenya have produced many notable long-distance athletes. Each country has federations that identify and cultivate top talent. Athletes from Ethiopia and Kenya hold, save for two exceptions, all the men's outdoor records for Olympic distance events from 800m to the marathon. Famous runners include Haile Gebrselassie, Kenenisa Bekele, Paul Tergat, and John Cheruiyot Korir.

Tourism
The development of tourism in this region has been identified as having the ability to create jobs and improve the economy. South Africa, Namibia, Mauritius, Botswana, Ghana, Cape Verde, Tanzania and Kenya have been identified as having well developed tourism industries. Cape Town and the surrounding area is very popular with tourists.

List of countries and regional organisation

Only seven African countries are not geopolitically a part of sub-Saharan Africa: Algeria, Egypt, Libya, Morocco, Tunisia and Western Sahara (claimed by Morocco); they form the UN subregion of Northern Africa, which also makes up the largest bloc of the Arab World. Nevertheless, some international organisations include Sudan as part of North Africa. Although a long-standing member of the Arab League, Sudan has around 30% non-Arab populations in the west (Darfur, Masalit, Zaghawa), far north (Nubian) and south (Kordofan, Nuba). and a largely Arabized native Nubian population that represents the majority at 70% hence its inclusion in North Africa, but geographically and culturally Sudan is part of Sub Saharan Africa. Mauritania and Niger only include a band of the Sahel along their southern borders. All other African countries have at least significant portions of their territory within sub-Saharan Africa.

Central Africa

  cap. Juba cur. South Sudanese pound (£) lang. English

 ECCAS (Economic Community of Central African States)
  (also in SADC) cap. Luanda cur. Angolan kwanza (Kz) lang. Portuguese
  (also in EAC) cap. Gitega (former Bujumbura) cur. Burundian franc (FBu) lang. French
  (also in SADC) cap. Kinshasa cur. Congolese franc (FC) lang. French
  (also in EAC) cap. Kigali cur. Rwandan franc (RF) lang. Kinyarwanda, French, English
  cap. São Tomé cur. São Tomé and Príncipe dobra (Db) lang. Portuguese

CEMAC (Economic and Monetary Community of Central Africa)
  cap. Yaoundé cur. Central African CFA franc (FCFA) lang. English, French
  cap. Bangui cur. Central African CFA franc (FCFA) lang. Sango, French
  cap. N'Djamena cur. Central African CFA franc (FCFA) lang. French, Arabic
  cap. Brazzaville cur. Central African CFA franc (FCFA) lang. French
  cap. Malabo cur. Central African CFA franc (FCFA) lang. Spanish, French
  cap. Libreville cur. Central African CFA franc (FCFA) lang. French

East Africa

  cap. Khartoum cur. Sudanese pound (£S.) lang. Arabic (Sudanese Arabic) and English
 cap. Juba cur. South Sudanese pound (£) lang. English and Arabic (Juba Arabic)
 cap. Mogadishu cur. Somali shilling (So.Sh /-) lang. Somali, Arabic (official)
  cap. Nairobi cur. Kenyan shilling (KSh /=) lang. Swahili, English
  cap. Kampala cur. Ugandan shilling (USh /=) lang. Swahili, English
  (also in ECCAS) cap. Kigali cur. Rwandan franc (RF) lang. Kinyarwanda, French, English
  (also in SADC) cap. Dodoma cur. Tanzanian shilling (TSh /=) lang. Swahili, English
  (also in ECCAS) cap. Gitega (former Bujumbura) cur. Burundian franc (FBu) lang. Kirundi, French
 cap. Asmara cur. Eritrean nakfa (Nfk) 'lang.' Tigrinya, Arabic, Italian, English (unofficial, lingua franca)
 cap. Djibouti cur. Djiboutian franc (Fdj) lang. Arabic, French (official)

Northeast Africa 

 Horn of Africa
 cap. Djibouti cur. Djiboutian franc (Fdj) lang. Arabic, French (official)
 cap. Asmara cur. Eritrean nakfa (Nfk) 'lang.' Tigrinya, Arabic, Italian, English (unofficial, lingua franca)
 cap. Mogadishu cur. Somali shilling (So.Sh) lang. Somali, Arabic (official)
 Sudan & South Sudan
  cap. Khartoum cur. Sudanese pound (£Sd.) lang. Arabic (Sudanese Arabic) and English
  cap. Juba cur. South Sudanese pound (£) lang. English and Arabic (Juba Arabic)

Southeast Africa
EAC
  (also in ECCAS) cap. Gitega (former Bujumbura) cur. Burundian franc (FBu) lang. Kirundi, French
  cap. Nairobi cur. Kenyan shilling (KSh /=) lang. Swahili, English
  (also in ECCAS) cap. Kigali cur. Rwandan franc (RF) lang. Kinyarwanda, French, English
  (also in SADC) cap. Dodoma cur. Tanzanian shilling (TSh. /=) lang. Swahili, English
  cap. Kampala cur. Ugandan shilling (USh /=) lang. Swahili, English

Southern Africa

SADC (Southern African Development Community)
  (also in ECCAS) cap. Luanda cur. Angolan kwanza (Kz) lang. Portuguese
  cap. Gaborone cur. Botswana pula (P) lang. Tswana, English
  cap. Moroni cur. Comorian franc (FC) lang. Comorian, Arabic, French
  cap. Mbabane cur. Swazi lilangeni (L)(E) lang. SiSwati, English
  cap. Maseru cur. Lesotho loti (L)(M) lang. Sesotho, English
  cap. Antananarivo cur. Malagasy ariary (Ar.) lang. Malagasy, French
  cap. Lilongwe cur. Malawian kwacha (MK) lang. English
  cap. Port Louis cur. Mauritian rupee (Re/Rs /-) lang. English
  cap. Maputo cur. Mozambican metical (MTn) lang. Portuguese
  cap. Windhoek cur. Namibian dollar (N$) lang. English
  cap. Victoria cur. Seychellois rupee (Re/Rs /-) lang. Seychellois Creole, English, French
  cap. Bloemfontein, Cape Town, Pretoria cur. South African rand (R) lang. 11 official languages
  cap. Lusaka cur. Zambian kwacha (ZK) lang. English
  cap. Harare cur. Zimbabwean dollar ($) lang. English

Sudan
Depending on classification Sudan is often not considered part of sub-Saharan Africa, as it is considered part of North Africa.
  cap. Khartoum cur. Sudanese pound (SDG) lang. Arabic and English

West Africa

ECOWAS (Economic Community of West African States)
  cap. Yamoussoukro, Abidjan cur. West African CFA franc (CFA)
  cap. Banjul cur. Gambian dalasi (D)
  cap. Accra cur. Ghanaian cedi (GH₵)
  cap. Conakry cur. Guinean franc (FG)
  cap. Monrovia cur. Liberian dollar (L$)
  cap. Nouakchott cur. Mauritanian ouguiya (UM)(sometimes, like Sudan, considered part of North Africa)
  cap. Abuja cur. Nigerian naira (₦)
  cap. Freetown cur. Sierra Leonean leone (Le)

UEMOA (West African Economic and Monetary Union)
  cap. Porto-Novo cur. West African CFA franc (CFA)
  cap. Ouagadougou cur. West African CFA franc (CFA)
  cap. Yamoussoukro, Abidjan cur. West African CFA franc (CFA)
  cap. Bissau cur. West African CFA franc (CFA)
  cap. Bamako cur. West African CFA franc (CFA)
  cap. Niamey cur. West African CFA franc (CFA)
  cap. Dakar cur. West African CFA franc (CFA)
  cap. Lomé cur. West African CFA franc (CFA)

See also

 African diaspora
 Black people
 Geography of Africa
 History of Africa

Sources

References

Citation 
 Taking Action to Reduce Poverty in Sub-Saharan Africa, World Bank Publications (1997), .

Further reading
 Chido, Diane E. From Chaos to Cohesion: A Regional Approach to Security, Stability, and Development in Sub-Saharan Africa. Carlisle, Pa.: Strategic Studies Institute and U.S. Army War College Press, 2013.
 Wm. Roger Louis and Jean Stengers: E.D. Morel's History of the Congo Reform Movement, Clarendon Press Oxford, 1968.

External links
 
 African People website (archived)
 The Story of Africa – BBC World Service

 
Geography of Africa
Historical regions
Regions of Africa